CP-93129 is a drug which acts as a potent and selective serotonin 5-HT1B receptor agonist, with approximately 150x and 200x selectivity over the closely related 5-HT1D and 5-HT1A receptors. It is used in the study of 5-HT1B receptors in the brain, particularly their role in modulating the release of other neurotransmitters.

References 

Serotonin receptor agonists
Pfizer brands